Roman Tatalin (born November 19, 1992) is a Russian professional ice hockey defenceman currently playing with Humo Tashkent in the Supreme Hockey League (VHL).

Tatalin played with HC Vityaz Podolsk of the Kontinental Hockey League (KHL) during the 2012–13 season.

References

External links

1992 births
Living people
Admiral Vladivostok players
Metallurg Novokuznetsk players
HC Spartak Moscow players
HC Vityaz players
Russian ice hockey defencemen
Universiade medalists in ice hockey
Universiade gold medalists for Russia
Competitors at the 2017 Winter Universiade
Sportspeople from Novosibirsk